Yvette Natalie Uy Tan (born February 11, 1975) is a Filipino author known as one of the Philippines' "most celebrated horror fiction writers." Her literary work has won Don Carlos Palanca and Philippine Graphic/Fiction awards.  She is also known for having written the screenplay for the 2017 independent film Ilawod, which received five nominations for the 2018 Star Awards for Movies.

References

External links
 

Living people
Filipino speculative fiction writers
1975 births